Niskajärvi is a lake located in the Kouvola municipality of the Kymenlaakso region of southern Finland. It is part of the Kymijoki catchment area.

There are several other lakes in Finland with the name Niskajärvi, of which this is the largest.

See also
List of lakes in Finland

References

Lakes of Kouvola
Kymenlaakso
Kymi basin